Derman (also Romanized as Dorman and Dormen; also known as Dīr Mār and Dīrmen) is a village in Javersiyan Rural District, Qareh Chay District, Khondab County, Markazi Province, Iran. At the 2006 census, its population was 1,238, in 345 families.

References 

Populated places in Khondab County